The 2003 Colgate Raiders football team was an American football team that represented Colgate University during the 2003 NCAA Division I-AA football season. Colgate was undefeated in the regular season, won the Patriot League championship and played in the Division I-AA national championship game.

In its eighth season under head coach Dick Biddle, the team compiled a 15–1 record (12–0 in the regular season). John Frieser, Tem Lukabu and Sean McCune were the team captains. 

The Raiders outscored opponents 480 to 303. Colgate's undefeated (7–0) conference record placed first in the Patriot League standings.

Colgate started the year unranked in the Division I-AA national poll, but as the season-long win streak developed, the Raiders steadily climbed in the rankings. They debuted at No. 24 in mid-September and were ranked No. 6 at the end of the regular season.

The Raiders were seeded No. 4 in the Division I-AA national playoffs. After three playoff wins, Colgate lost to Delaware in the national championship game. In the final poll of the year, Delaware was ranked No. 1 and Colgate No. 2.

Colgate played its home games, including its first two playoff games, at Andy Kerr Stadium in Hamilton, New York.

Schedule

References

Colgate
Colgate Raiders football seasons
Patriot League football champion seasons
Colgate Raiders football